Botswana passports are issued by the Passport Division of the Department of Ministry of Nationality, Immigration And Gender Affairs to citizens of Botswana for international travel.

On 8 March 2010, the Department of Immigration and Citizenship began issuing electronic passports to the general public. The validity of all Botswana non-electronic passports expired on 31 December 2011.

The Botswana passport, which features 48 pages, is written in English and French. The firsts page features a map of Botswana superimposed with wildlife.

As of 2014 the Botswana passport was the 4th most powerful on the African continent, allowing Batswana citizens travel to at least 70 countries visa free, 28 with visa on arrival and 121 requiring a visa. The passport is ranked 58th in the world.

See also
Visa requirements for Botswana citizens
List of passports

References

External links
 Information about applications for Botswana passports from the official website of the Ministry of Labour and Home Affairs

Botswana
Government of Botswana